Alexander Bay  may refer to:

 Alexander Bay, Newfoundland and Labrador in Canada
 Alexander Bay, Northern Cape in South Africa
 Alexander Bay Airport
 Alexander Bay Commando
 Alexander Bay Station